The Jewish Museum of Belgium is a museum in Brussels, Belgium, focusing on the history of the Jews in Belgium.

History 
The idea of founding a Jewish museum emerged in the late 1970s and was based on two motifs: the lack of a Jewish museum dealing with history and art, although Judaism has been present in Belgium since the Middle Ages, and the small number of public collections.

As part of the celebrations surrounding Belgium's 150th birthday in 1979, Baron Bloch, then President of the Central Council and alongside his successor in office, Baron Schnek, suggested driving exhibition of art and history of Belgian Jewry. The event was successful, and a small group was founded in 1981 which put together a collection as well as a financing basis and the purchase of a property. Official support was finally gained in the mid-1980s. Initially, the Ministry of Labor and Finance, later also the French and Flemish-speaking communities and the regions agreed to support the group's efforts.

Work continued on makeshift premises above the Beth Israel Synagogue on Rue de Stalingrad (Stalingradstraat), which were provided by the Central Council. The museum has been compiling its collection since 1990 and installed its first permanent exhibition there. In 2005, the company moved to its current premises on Rue des Minimes (Miniemenstraat).

Museum and collections
The museum has a collection of items which relate to Jewish customs from Europe, Asia, and Africa, dating back as far as the 18th century and mostly from the region to the east of river Rhine and countries around the Mediterranean.

The museum has 750 objects of judaica, 1,250 works of art, and an archive of 20,000 photographs, 5,000 posters, compact discs, LPs, and compact cassettes.

The museum also has six thematic libraries containing a total of 25,000 works and editions, including works in Yiddish and Hebrew, works of Jewish artists, and genealogies.

Shooting 

On 24 May 2014, four peopletwo visiting Israelis and two people who worked at the museumwere killed in a shooting at the museum.

See also

The Holocaust in Belgium
List of museums in Brussels

References

External links
Official Website

Jewish Belgian history
Belgium
Museums established in 2005
Museums in Brussels
Jews and Judaism in Brussels
City of Brussels
2005 establishments in Belgium